The following is the complete discography of the Alan Parsons Project. Over the years they have released 12 studio albums, 14 compilation albums and 38 singles.

Albums

Studio albums

Compilation albums

Singles

Music videos
"I Wouldn't Want to Be Like You" (1977)
"What Goes Up" (1978)
"Lucifer" (1979)
"Turn Of A Friendly Card" (1980)
"Games People Play" (1980)
"Time" (1980)
"The Gold Bug" (1981)
"Psychobabble" (1982)
"Don't Answer Me" (1984)
"Prime Time" (1984)
"Sirius/Eye In The Sky" (Features clips from Nineteen Eighty-Four) (1984)
"Let's Talk About Me" (1985)
"Stereotomy" (1986)
"Standing on Higher Ground" (1987)
"Freudiana" (1990)

Live (Setlist)
"The Alan Parsons Project at Night of the Proms" (1990)

See also
 Alan Parsons for Alan Parsons solo albums and other works

References

External links
Official discography of The Alan Parsons Project

Alan Parsons Project, The
Discographies of British artists
Discography